Maria Teresa Goretti (October 16, 1890 – July 6, 1902) is an Italian virgin-martyr of the Catholic Church, and one of the youngest saints to be canonized. She was born to a farming family. Her father died when she was nine, and the family had to share a house with another family, the Serenellis. Maria took over household duties while her mother, brothers and sister worked in the fields. 

One afternoon, Alessandro, the Serenellis' 20-year-old son, made sexual advances to her. When she refused to submit to him, he stabbed her 14 times. She was taken to the hospital but she died forgiving him. He was arrested, convicted and jailed. During imprisonment, he repented. After 27 years, he was released from prison and visited her mother to beg forgiveness, which she granted. He later became a lay brother in a Capuchin monastery and died in 1970. She was beatified in 1947 and canonized in 1950. She is especially venerated in the Congregation of the Passion (Passionists).

Biography 
Maria Goretti was born on October 16, 1890, in Corinaldo, in the Province of Ancona, then in the Kingdom of Italy, to Luigi Goretti and Assunta Carlini, the third of seven children: Antonio (who died in infancy), Angelo, Maria, Mariano (Marino), Alessandro (Sandrino), Ersilia, and Teresa.

By the time Maria was five, her family had become so poor that they were forced to give up their farm, move, and work for other farmers. In 1896, they moved to Colle Gianturco, near Paliano and Frosinone, about fifty miles outside Rome; and then in 1899 to Le Ferriere, near modern Latina and Nettuno in Lazio, where they lived in a building, "La Cascina Antica," they shared with another family which included Giovanni Serenelli and his son, Alessandro. Soon, her father became very sick with malaria, and died when she was just nine. While her mother and siblings worked in the fields, she would cook, sew, watch Teresa, and keep the house clean.

Maria's death 

On July 5, 1902, eleven-year-old Maria was sitting on the outside steps of her home, sewing one of Alessandro's shirts and watching Teresa, while Alessandro was threshing beans in the barnyard. Knowing she would be alone, he returned to the house and threatened to stab her with an awl if she did not do what he said; he was intending to rape her. She would not submit, however, protesting that what he wanted to do was a mortal sin and warning him that he would go to Hell. She fought desperately and kept screaming, "No! It is a sin! God does not want it!" He first choked her, but when she insisted she would rather die than submit to him, he stabbed her fourteen times. She tried to reach the door, but he stopped her by stabbing her three more times before running away.

Teresa awoke with the noise and started crying, and when Assunta and Giovanni came to check on her, they found Maria on the floor bleeding and took her to the nearest hospital in Nettuno. She underwent surgery without anesthesia, but her injuries were beyond the doctors' help. Halfway through the surgery, she woke up. The pharmacist said to her, "Maria, think of me in Paradise." She looked at him and said, "Well, who knows, which of us is going to be there first?" "You, Maria," he replied. "Then I will gladly think of you," she said. She also expressed concern for her mother's welfare. The following day, 24 hours after the attack, having expressed forgiveness for Alessandro and stating that she wanted to have him in Heaven with her, she died of her injuries.

Journalist Noel Crusz provided a more detailed account:

 On July 5 in 1902, at 3 pm whilst [Maria's mother] Assunta and the other children were at the threshing floor, Serenelli who persistently sought sexual favours from the  girl approached her. She was taking care of her infant sister in the farmhouse.  threatened her with a 10-inch awl, and when she refused, as she had always done, he stabbed her 14 times.

 The wounds penetrated her throat, with lesions of the pericardium, heart, lungs, and diaphragm. Surgeons at Orsenigo were surprised that she was still alive. In a dying deposition, in the presence of the Chief of Police, she told her mother of Serenelli's sexual harassment, and two previous attempts made to rape her. She was afraid to reveal this earlier since she was threatened with death.

A third account of the assault was presented by Italian historian Giordano Bruno Guerri in 1985. He asserted that, while in prison, Alessandro stated that he did not complete the assault and Maria died a virgin. Guerri identifies the weapon as an awl rather than a dagger.

Serenelli's imprisonment  
Alessandro Serenelli was captured shortly after the attack: the police taking him to prison overtook the ambulance carrying Maria to the hospital. Originally, he was going to be sentenced to life, but since he was a minor at that time it was commuted to 30 years; judges even considered he was not as mature as he was expected to be for a 20-year-old, and that he grew up in a poor, neglectful family, with several brothers and relatives suffering from madness and an alcoholic father. It has also been suggested that it was due to her mother's plea for mercy that he was not sentenced to death. He insisted he had attempted to rape her several times and decided to kill her because of her refusal and desperate crying. He remained unrepentant and uncommunicative from the world for three years, until a local bishop, Monsignor Giovanni Blandini, visited him in jail. He wrote a thank you note to the Bishop asking for his prayers and telling him about a dream, "in which Maria gave him lilies, which burned immediately in his hands."

After his release, Alessandro visited Assunta and begged her forgiveness. She forgave him, and they attended Mass together the next day, receiving Holy Communion side by side. He reportedly prayed to her every day and referred to her as "my little saint." 

Alessandro later became a lay brother of the Order of Friars Minor Capuchin, living in a monastery and working as its receptionist and gardener until he died in 1970 at age 87.

Beatification and canonization 

Maria was beatified on April 27, 1947. In attendance at the ceremony were both Assunta and Pope Pius XII. On the evening of the ceremony in Saint Peter's Basilica, the Pope walked over to and greeted Assunta. She later reported, "When I saw the Pope coming, I prayed, 'Madonna, please help me', and I felt faint. He put his hand on my head and said, "Blessed mother, happy mother, mother of a Blessed!" Afterward, both could be seen with eyes wet with tears.

Three years later, on June 24, 1950, Pius XII canonized Maria as a saint, the "Saint Agnes of the 20th century." Assunta was again present at the ceremony, along with her four remaining sons and daughters. Alessandro was also present.

Owing to the huge crowd present, the ceremonies associated with the canonization were held outside Saint Peter's Basilica, in the Piazza San Pietro. Pius XII spoke, not as before in Latin, but in Italian. "We order and declare, that the blessed Maria Goretti can be venerated as a Saint and we introduce her into the Canon of Saints". Some 500,000 people, among them a majority of youth, had come from around the world. Pius asked them: "Young people, pleasure of the eyes of Jesus, are you determined to resist any attack on your chastity with the help of the grace of God?" A resounding "yes" was the answer.

Maria's three brothers would claim that she intervened miraculously in their lives. Angelo heard her voice telling him to emigrate to America. Alessandro was reportedly miraculously given a sum of money to finance his own emigration to join Angelo. Sandrino died in the United States in 1917, and Angelo died in Italy when he returned there in 1964. Mariano said he heard her voice telling him to stay in his trench when the rest of his unit partook in a charge against Austro-Hungarian soldiers in the Isonzo during World War I. He, the only survivor of that charge, lived until 1975 and had a large family.

Maria's remains are kept in the crypt of the Passionist Basilica of Nostra Signora delle Grazie e Santa Maria Goretti in Nettuno, south of Rome. It is often incorrectly reported that her body remained incorrupt after her death. This is because her skeletal remains are contained in a wax statue lying on its back inside a glass casket and the statue has been mistaken for her body.

Feast day 

Maria's feast day, celebrated on July 6, was inserted in the General Roman Calendar when it was revised in 1969. She is the patron saint of chastity, rape victims, girls, youth, teenage girls, poverty, purity, and forgiveness.

In art 
Maria is represented in art as a wavy-haired young girl in farmer clothes or a white dress, with a bouquet of lilies in her hands, and she has sometimes counted among the ranks of the Passionist order since her spiritual formation was guided by the Passionists. Both lilies and white garments are traditional icons of virginity in Catholic iconography.

In media 

Heaven over the Marshes (Cielo sulla palude) is an Italian film based on her life, filmed in 1949 and directed by Augusto Genina. Ines Orsini plays her and Mauro Matteuci plays Alessandro. It was awarded a prize at the 10th International Exhibition of Cinema Art at Venice in 1949, as the one which contributed most to the spiritual and moral betterment of mankind.

Marcel Delannoy wrote a radiophonic opera, Maria Goretti, in 1953.

The subplot of the canonization of an 11-year-old girl in William Gaddis's 1955 novel The Recognitions was based on the case of Maria Goretti. 

In 2003, Maria Goretti, a RAI Italian TV movie directed by Giulio Base, starring Martina Pinto as Maria, was acclaimed by critics.

See also 

 List of Catholic saints
 Incorruptibility

Footnotes

External links 

 Friends of Maria Goretti
 St. Maria Goretti: The Little Saint of Great Mercy 
 Saint Maria Goretti
 at St. Maria Goretti's canonization:
 Pope Pius XII's speech
 Pope Pius XII's homily
 An "Insight" episode based on Maria Goretti, portrayed by Ann Jillian with Frank Gorshin

1890 births
1902 deaths
1902 murders in Italy
20th-century Christian saints
20th-century Roman Catholic martyrs
Beatifications by Pope Pius XII
Canonizations by Pope Pius XII
Christian female saints of the Late Modern era
Deaths by stabbing in Italy
Female murder victims
Incidents of violence against girls
Italian Roman Catholic saints
19th-century Italian women
20th-century Italian women
Murdered Italian children
Passionists
People from the Province of Ancona
People murdered in Lazio
Rape in Italy
Roman Catholic child saints
Violence against women in Italy